The Electric Vehicle Association (EVA) is a non-profit educational organization that promotes the advancement and widespread adoption of battery electric vehicles.  It was formed in 1967 in San Jose, California.

Members
The Electric Vehicle Association (EVA) has over one thousand members internationally, with most in the United States.  Members of the EVA receive the monthly "Current EVents" magazine.  Many members also belong to one of more than fifty chapters, which serve a local area and meet periodically to exchange information pertinent to electric transportation. Some have their own newsletters as well.

Other EVA chapters have developed into substantial 501c3's on their own, such as Plug In America, which began as a chapter of the EVA. Still, others sprang up to promote special interests, such as plug-in hybrid vehicles by CalCars.org. Starting with a commercially available product such as the Toyota Prius, an external power source was added to recharge the on-board battery, instead of burning hydrocarbons to accomplish that task.  It's cleaner and more efficient to do so. Now plug-in hybrids abound in the marketplace, owing largely to this concerted push.

In recent years, various Original Equipment Manufacturers (OEMs) began producing fully electric vehicles for sale, necessitating less ″backyard craftsmanship″ efforts by our members. Then automakers took notice and the product has become a serious market segment contender. Now anyone can go out and buy a battery-powered car, bring it home and enjoy the benefits, which are substantial.

But experiments with the many trade-offs in automotive design continue. Exploration of alternative approaches develops into products that become commercially viable. The loose-knit nature of the organization promotes such interaction.

The past two decades have shown the technological advances which allow for the products seen on the streets worldwide today.  EAA members have experimented with and demonstrated EV feasibility since the earliest days.  Automakers are now progressively being required to reduce the emission footprint per distance traveled and will continue to need to meet both EU and EPA limits.

EVA Chapters
Full Current Chapter List

Select Chapters:
 Central Coast Chapter Electric Auto Association (California)
 Sacramento Electric Vehicle Association (California)
 Electric Vehicle Association of San Diego (California)
 Silicon Valley Chapter Electric Auto Association (California)
 Denver Electric Vehicle Council (Colorado)
 Seattle Electric Vehicle Association (Washington) 
 Electric Vehicle Association of Greater Washington, DC (Washington DC, Maryland & Northern Virginia)

See also 
 U.S. Department of Energy
 Drive Clean
 CalCars
 Plug-in electric vehicles in the United States
 Government incentives for plug-in electric vehicles in the U.S. 
 Green vehicle
 List of modern production plug-in electric vehicles 
 Plug In America
 Plug-in electric vehicle 
 RechargeIT 
 Tour de Sol
 Evolve KY - Kentucky's Electric Vehicle Group

References
Electric Vehicle Association.
21st Century Automotive Challenge (PDF).
Electric Auto Association Europe

Battery electric vehicle organizations
Non-profit organizations based in California
1967 establishments in California
Automobile associations in the United States
Organizations established in 1967